Ana Sol Gutierrez (born January 11, 1942) is a Democratic politician from the U.S. state of Maryland who was the first Latina to ever be elected to the Maryland General Assembly. She served four terms in the Maryland House of Delegates, representing Montgomery County in Maryland's District 18. Gutierrez sat on the Appropriations Committee and was chair of the Delinquency Prevention and Diversion Services Task Force beginning in 2006. In 2003, Gutierrez was the first Latina elected to state office.

In 2016, Gutierrez ran unsuccessfully for the Democratic nomination in Maryland's 8th Congressional District, ultimately being defeated by Jamie Raskin.

Background
Gutierrez was born in El Salvador and attended Bethesda-Chevy Chase High School before moving on to Pennsylvania State University, garnering a B.S. in chemistry and earned an M.S. in technology of management, scientific & technical information systems from American University. She did her postgraduate studies in applied engineering at George Washington University. Gutierrez has served in all three levels of government.  As a deputy administrator in the Transportation Department during the Clinton Administration, on the Montgomery County School Board, and as a Delegate for the 18th District.

Notable positions held 

 Member, Board of Education, Montgomery County, 1990–98 (president, 1995–96; vice-president, 1994–95). 
 Member, Governor's Commission on Hispanic Affairs, 1989–91, 1992–94. 
 Deputy Administrator, Research and Special Programs Administration, U.S. Department of Transportation, 1994–96. 
 Member, Task Force to Study Driver Licensing Documentation, 2003–04.

Drivers' licenses for undocumented immigrants 
Ana Sol Gutierrez is strongly allied with CASA of Maryland in support of a system whereby the default Maryland Driving Permit will not conform to the standards mandated by the Real ID Act, and may be issued to undocumented immigrants. She favors the issuance of a special ID which will conform to federal standards which would allow the bearer to enter federal buildings, board planes, and engage in other transactions which require identity cards conforming to the standards set out in the Real ID Act of 2005. She opposes a two-tier licensing system which would issue driving permits to undocumented immigrants, but which would not conform to the Real ID standards which would be the default for Maryland driving permits issued to qualified Marylanders, because "[i]n this climate, that's a scarlet letter". Governor Martin O'Malley later directed the Maryland Motor Vehicle Administration to phase in compliance to the Real ID standards by 2010.

References

External links

1942 births
Salvadoran emigrants to the United States
American University alumni
American politicians of Salvadoran descent
Eberly College of Science alumni
George Washington University School of Engineering and Applied Science alumni
Democratic Party members of the Maryland House of Delegates
Women state legislators in Maryland
Hispanic and Latino American state legislators in Maryland
Hispanic and Latino American women in politics
Living people
21st-century American politicians
21st-century American women politicians
Sol family